Jan Bohuslav Sobota (March 1, 1939–May 2, 2012) was a Czechoslovakian-born fine bookbinder. He is known for his often playful sculptural bindings that transform the book into a three-dimensional work of art. He is known for books of all sizes, including a significant output of miniature books. The son of a book collector, Sobota trained in Czechoslovakia as an apprentice in the Plzeň workshop of Karel Silinger and graduated from the Academy of Applied Arts, Prague, in 1957. He completed his Master's Degree at the same institution in 1969, and in 1979, was declared "Meister der Einbandkunst" in Germany. The same year, he submitted the first ever sculptural book to the Czech triennale. Sobota organized the first international exhibition of book sculpture in 1982, "The Book as Artistic Object in an Interior," staged in Frantiskovy Lazne.

In 1982, Sobota and his family defected to Switzerland, where he worked privately and demonstrated bookbinding in Basler Papier Muhle. In 1984 the Sobota family moved to the USA, sponsored by the Rowfant Club of Cleveland, a prestigious book collectors' club in Cleveland. Members of the international book community also sought to assist him. Extensive Czech training in book conservation prepared him for positions as a book conservator at Case Western Reserve University and at the Bridwell Library at Southern Methodist University. With his wife Jarmila Sobota he established the Saturday's Book Arts Gallery, which moved with the couple. In 1997, the Sobotas moved back to the now Czech Republic, where they opened a gallery in Loket.

Between 1969 and 2012, Sobota's work was displayed in thirty-five individual shows and 160 group exhibitions. He was posthumously awarded a Lifetime Achievement Award by the Guild of Bookworkers in 2012.

Citations 

Book artists
Czech sculptors
Czechoslovak emigrants to Switzerland
Swiss sculptors